The 2011 World Cyber Games (also known as WCG 2011) took place from 8 December to 11 December 2011 in Busan, South Korea.

Official games

PC games

 Counter-Strike 1.6 
 CrossFire (developed by Smile Gate)
 FIFA 11
 League of Legends
 Special Force (developed by Dragonfly) (service name Soldier Front in the United States) 
 StarCraft II: Wings of Liberty
 Warcraft III: The Frozen Throne
 World of Warcraft: Cataclysm

Xbox 360 games

 Tekken 6

Mobile games

 Asphalt 6: Adrenaline

Promotion games

 Carom 3D
 Dungeon & Fighter
 Lost Saga

Results

Official

Promotion

References

External links
WCG 2011
WCG 2011 Lost Saga Game: Interview with the winners

2011 in esports
2011 in South Korean sport
League of Legends competitions
StarCraft competitions
Warcraft competitions
World Cyber Games events
Esports in South Korea
December 2011 sports events in Asia